Club Atlético Defensores de Belgrano (usually known as Defensores de Belgrano) is an Argentine sports club from Nuñez, Buenos Aires. The club is mostly known for its football team, which currently plays in Primera Nacional, the regionalised second division of the Argentine league system.

Apárt from football, other sports practised at Defensores de Belgrano are boxing, Brazilian jiu-jitsu, kickboxing, karate, and artistic roller skating.

History 

Defensores de Belgrano was founded on 25 May 1906 by a group of young people who wanted to participate in the football leagues of Buenos Aires. In 1914, Defensores de Belgrano won the División Intermedia champion, therefore promoted to Primera División, the top division. The squad debuted in Primera in 1915, being relegated to the second division at the end of that season. The team returned to Primera for the 1918 season, remaining there until 1934 when the official association (AFA) (which Defensores was affiliated to) merged with the dissident professional league (Liga Argentina de Football); as a result of the merger, all teams in the amateur league were relegated to the second division.

During its first years, the team's color's were light blue and light pink but would later be changed to the red and black colors that have remained since then. The stadium was at the "Plaza Alberti" venue in the suburb of Belgrano, Buenos Aires.

In 1934 two players of the club, Ernesto Belis and Luis Izetta went on to play for the Argentina national team in the 1934 FIFA World Cup held in Italy that year.

For many decades Defensores played the league games between the B and the C League's, gaining promotion and also being relegated. Throughout that period a rivalry against Platense was developed.

In August 2011, the veteran 37-year-old player Ariel Ortega (who had been played for All Boys during the 2010–11 season) was signed by Defensores de Belgrano. The "Burrito" made his debut in the match against Deportivo Morón scoring a goal by penalty shot.

Estadio Juan Pasquale 
The Estadio Juan Pasquale is located in the Nuñez district of Buenos Aires. It is approximately 10 walking blocks away from Monumental stadium. The street's surrounding the Juan Pasquale contain many graffitied wall's and objects in tribute of Defensores de Belgrano, and are the meeting points of many of the club's supporters which begin walking in large groups upon their arrival to the stadium. The capacity of the stadium holds 9,000 people.

Players

Current squad

Out on loan

The club operates its junior divisions, beginning from age categories of Sub-7 until Sub-20 level.

Former players

  Eddy Carazas
  Tommy Mosquera

Honours
 División Intermedia (2): 1914 FAF, 1917
Primera B (2): 1967, 2000–01
Primera C (4): 1953, 1958, 1972, 1991–92

References

External links

 
 Defelandia

 
Association football clubs established in 1906
1906 establishments in Argentina
Football clubs in Buenos Aires